Erce Kardeşler (born 14 March 1994) is a Turkish professional footballer who plays for Hatayspor.

Career

Trabzonspor
On 19 July 2019 Kardeşler joined Trabzonspor from Altınordu im return of a TRY2.5 million transfer fee, during 2019 summer transfer window.

He played in starting line up of Trabzonspor up against FC Krasnodar at Group C encounter of 2019–20 UEFA Europa League that ended 3–1 in favour of Russian outfit, held at Krasnodar Stadium, Krasnodar, on 7 November 2019.

Hatayspor
He joined Hatayspor for transfer fee of 400.000 Euro in July 2022. He signed a four-year contract with the club.

Personal life
Kardeşler is son of former Bursaspor goalkeeper and current coach Eser Kardeşler. Arda Kardeşler, older brother of Erce, is a football referee arbitrating at Süper Lig level, under Turkish Football Federation license.

Honours
Trabzonspor
Turkish Cup (1): 2019–20
Turkish Super Cup (1): 2020
Süper Lig (1): 2021–22

References

External links
 Profile at TFF
 

1994 births
Living people
Sportspeople from Çanakkale
Association football goalkeepers
Turkish footballers
Bursaspor footballers
Altınordu F.K. players
Trabzonspor footballers
Hatayspor footballers
TFF Third League players
TFF Second League players
TFF First League players
Süper Lig players